The 2009 Trophée des Alpilles was a professional tennis tournament played on outdoor hard courts. It was the first edition of the tournament which was part of the 2009 ATP Challenger Tour. It took place in Saint-Rémy-de-Provence, France between 7 and 13 September 2009.

Singles main-draw entrants

Seeds

 Rankings are as of August 31, 2009.

Other entrants
The following players received wildcards into the singles main draw:
  Jonathan Eysseric
  Jonathan Hilaire
  Mathieu Rodrigues
  Cyril Saulnier

The following players received entry from the qualifying draw:
  Dorian Descloix
  Colin Fleming
  Thomas Oger
  Thomas Paire

Champions

Singles

 Marcos Baghdatis def.  Xavier Malisse, 6–4, 6–1

Doubles

 Jiří Krkoška /  Lukáš Lacko def.  Ruben Bemelmans /  Niels Desein, 6–1, 3–6, [10–3]

External links
Official site
ITF Search 

Trophee des Alpilles
Trophée des Alpilles
2009 in French tennis